Nashville received numerous awards and nominations from various critical organizations, including major institutions such as the Academy Awards, Golden Globes, and British Academy Film Awards, as well as regional critical associations. The film was nominated for a total of 11 Golden Globe nominations, to date the most ever received by one film. It also received four Golden Globe nominations in a single acting category; this was and remains unprecedented for major film award shows.

It won a BAFTA Film Award for Best Sound Track. Altman won for best director from: Cartagena Film Festival; Kansas City Film Critics Circle Awards; National Board of Review; National Society of Film Critics Awards; and the New York Film Critics Circle Awards. Lily Tomlin was awarded the New York Film Critics Circle Award for Best Supporting Actress.

Accolades

Notes

References

Sources

External links
 

Lists of accolades by film